De-Jay Terblanche (born 25 June 1985) is a South African rugby union footballer for the  in the Currie Cup and in the Rugby Challenge. He plays mostly as a prop.

He was a member of the Pumas side that won the Vodacom Cup for the first time in 2015, beating  24–7 in the final. Terblanche made eight appearances during the season.

He joined French Pro D2 side  on a three-month loan deal at the start of 2016.

References

External links

itsrugby.co.uk profile

Living people
1985 births
South African rugby union players
Rugby union props
People from the Western Cape
Pumas (Currie Cup) players
People from Knysna
Southern Kings players
Stade Montois players
Rugby union players from the Western Cape